Weatherby Pond is a small lake located northeast of the Village of Richfield Springs in the Town of Warren in Herkimer County, New York. It was the original water supply for the Village of Richfield Springs before Allen Lake was purchased by the village..

References 

Lakes of New York (state)
Lakes of Herkimer County, New York